

The Albatros L 103 (company designation) / Albatros Al 103 (RLM designation) was a German experimental aircraft of the 1930s. It was a parasol-wing landplane of conventional configuration, seating the pilot and flight test observer in separate, open cockpits. The Al 103 was used to test variations in sweepback, dihedral and tailplane area.

Specifications (L 103)

Notes

References

External links
 German Aircraft between 1919-1945

Parasol-wing aircraft
Single-engined tractor aircraft
1930s German experimental aircraft
L 103
Aircraft first flown in 1933